The consensus 1956 College Basketball All-American team, as determined by aggregating the results of six major All-American teams.  To earn "consensus" status, a player must win honors from a majority of the following teams: the Associated Press, Look Magazine, The United Press International, the Newspaper Enterprise Association (NEA), Collier's Magazine and the International News Service.

1956 Consensus All-America team

Individual All-America teams

AP Honorable Mention:

 Don Boldebuck, Houston
 Joe Belmont, Duke
 Jerry Bird, Kentucky
 Art Bunte, Utah
 Carl Cain, Iowa
 Joe Capua, Wyoming
 Jerry Harper, Alabama
 Paul Judson, Illinois
 Jim Krebs, Southern Methodist
 Hal Lear, Temple
 Bill Logan, Iowa
 Johnny McCarthy, Canisius
 Jim McLaughlin, Saint Louis
 Vic Molodet, North Carolina State
 Jim Paxson, Dayton
 Terry Rand, Marquette
 George Selleck, Stanford
 Morris Taft, UCLA
 Terry Tebbs, Brigham Young
 Gary Thompson, Iowa State
 Charlie Tyra, Louisville

See also
 1955–56 NCAA men's basketball season

References

NCAA Men's Basketball All-Americans
All-Americans